Taruia Franz Krainer (born 1 June 1991) is a French Polynesian road cyclist. He is currently the sports director of team UC Cholet 49.

Krainer was born in Arue, French Polynesia, and was educated at la Mennais high school. He moved to France at the age of 16 to pursue a career in cycling and to study.

He raced with UC Briochine from 2009 to 2011, then joined the Vendée U team in 2012. In 2017 he won the Prix Marcel Bergereau. In 2018 he placed third in the Entre Brenne et Montmorillonnais. He also won the 2018 Tour Tahiti Nui. In June 2020 he was appointed sports director of UC Cholet. In 2022, he competed in the mixed team relay with the French Polynesian team at the 2022 UCI Road World Championships.

Major results

2012
 1st Paris–Tours Espoirs
2013
 4th Road race, National Under-23 Road Championships
2014
 6th Overall Paris–Arras Tour
2015
 1st 
1st Stages 4 & 8
 8th Overall Le Triptyque des Monts et Châteaux
2016
 1st Stages 3, 5a & 9 
2017
 1st 
 1st 
 7th Overall Tour de Gironde
2018
 1st Overall 
 1st Overall Tour Tahiti Nui
1st Staes 2, 4 & 5b
 3rd Entre Brenne et Montmorillonnais
 4th Grand Prix de la Ville de Nogent-sur-Oise
2019
 1st Stage 6 Tour Tahiti Nui

References

External links

Living people
1991 births
People from Papeete
French Polynesian cyclists
French male cyclists